Michael Weiss (born 17 January 1981 in Gumpoldskirchen) is an Austrian triathlete and cyclist. He represented Austria in the 2004 Summer Olympics in men's mountain bike, cross-country and is the 2011 XTERRA Triathlon world champion.

Career

Mountain biking
Weiss was a member of the Austrian national mountain bike team from 1999–2008. In 2003, he won the under–23 European Mountain Bike Championships. The next year, in 2004, he became the Austrian mountain bike champion and competed in the 2004 Summer Olympic's mountain bike race where he placed 32nd with a time 2:30:14. After failing to qualify for 2008 Olympics in Beijing, Weiss eventually turned to triathlon.

Triathlon
Weiss took his skill in mountain biking and applied them to the XTERRA Triathlon series. He has had success at the championships in Maui placing second in 2008, third in 2009 and 2010 before winning the championship in 2011. In May 2010, Weiss became the first Austrian to win an Ironman competition by winning the 2010 Ironman St.George race. In 2013, in his first race after serving his two-year doping ban, Weiss won Ironman Cozumel.

Doping ban
In November 2011, Weiss was given a two–year ban for a blood doping infringement in 2005 while competing in mountain biking. An independent commission of Austria's anti-doping agency (Nationale Anti-Doping Agentur Austria, NADA), said that it had found Weiss to be guilty of having his blood taken for enrichment at a blood lab in Vienna in 2005. NADA initially cleared Weiss in September 2010, but that decision was reversed a year later and subsequently issued the ban from competition. Weiss declared his innocence but chose not to appeal the ban, citing the time and expense that would be required to do so.

References

External links
 

1981 births
Austrian male cyclists
Austrian male triathletes
Cyclists at the 2004 Summer Olympics
Doping cases in cycling
Doping cases in triathlon
Austrian sportspeople in doping cases
Living people
Austrian mountain bikers
Olympic cyclists of Austria